The men's triathlon was part of the Triathlon at the 2006 Asian Games program, was held in Corniche Triathlon Course on December 8, 2006.

The race was held over the "international distance" and consisted of  swimming,  road bicycle racing, and  road running.

Schedule
All times are Arabia Standard Time (UTC+03:00)

Results 
Legend
DNF — Did not finish

References 

Results

Triathlon at the 2006 Asian Games